It's Tee Time is the debut studio album by American rapper Sweet Tee. It was released in 1989 via Profile Records. Recording sessions took place at Bayside Sound Recording Studio, Inc. and at Power Play Studios in New York. Production was handled by Hurby Luv Bug, The Invincibles, and Sweet Tee herself. It features a guest appearance from DJ Jazzy Joyce. The album peaked at number 169 on the US Billboard 200. It spawned five singles: "It's My Beat", "It's Like That Y'All" b/w "I Got Da Feelin'", "On the Smooth Tip" and "Let's Dance".

Track listing

Personnel
Toi "Sweet Tee" Jackson – main artist, songwriter, producer (track 9)
Joyce "DJ Jazzy Joyce" Spencer – featured artist (track 6)
Karen Anderson – backing vocals (track 5)
Lenora Helmm – backing vocals (track 5)
Jimmy Young – backing vocals (track 5)
Charis'se Rose – backing vocals (track 9)
John Ficarrotta – lead guitar, bass
Peter Puleo – synthesizer
Hurby "Luv Bug" Azor – songwriter, producer, mixing (track 6)
Andre DeBourg – recording (tracks: 1-5, 7-9), mixing
Patrick Adams – recording (track 6)
Howie Weinberg – mastering
Janet Perr – art direction, design
Caroline Greyshock – photography

Charts

References

External links

1988 debut albums
Profile Records albums
East Coast hip hop albums
Albums produced by Hurby Azor
Hip hop albums by American artists